Lee Russell may refer to:

Lee M. Russell (1875–1943), American politician from Mississippi
Lee Russell (record producer) (born 1970), English record producer and musician
Lee Russell (footballer) (born 1969), English footballer
Liane Russell (1923–2019), American geneticist and conservationist